Edmílson is a given name. It most commonly refers to José Edmílson Gomes Moraes, a retired Brazilian footballer.

Other notable people with the name include:

 Edmilson Alves (born 1976), Brazilian footballer
 Edmílson Barros de Souza (born 1977), Brazilian footballer
 Edmilson Carlos Abel (born 1974), Brazilian footballer
 Edmilson de Carvalho Barbosa (born 1979), Brazilian footballer
 Edmilson Dias de Lucena (born 1968), Brazilian footballer
 Edmilson Ferreira (born 1979), Brazilian footballer
 Edmilson Gonçalves Pimenta (born 1971), Brazilian footballer
 Edmilson Junior, (born 1994), Belgian footballer
 Edmilson Marques Pardal (born 1980), Brazilian footballer
 Edmílson Matias (born 1974), Brazilian footballer
 Edmilson Rodrigues (born 1957), Brazilian politician, mayor of Belém
 Edmilson da Silva Melo (born 1980), Brazilian footballer
 Edmilson Santana (born 1987), Brazilian long-distance runner
 Edmílson dos Santos Carmo Júnior (born 1987), Brazilian footballer
 Edmílson dos Santos Silva (born 1982), Brazilian footballer